Carl Frederik Waage Beck (born 1979 in Copenhagen, Denmark) is a Copenhagen-based community activist and artist working under the pseudonym Paintshooter.

Paintshooter graduated in 2006 with an MSc in Economics & Business Administration from Copenhagen Business School.

As a child, he was inspired to become an artist, as he grew up surrounded by artists who gathered at his parents' art gallery "Kaffeslottet" on the island of Bornholm.

Beck is a self-taught artist, an impressionist - he mostly paints portraits alla prima in oil on canvas.

In 2009 his first show – an event and portrait exhibition named "Elect your saviour"- took place in Brorsons Church, Copenhagen.

The Exhibition and church was at that time occupied by roughly 30 Iraqi refugees seeking Asylum in Denmark. 
Paintshooter was the vicechairman of the Parish Council which allowed the Iraqis to stay in the church.

The Refugee seekers were later dislodged in a police raid ending a 3-month long stalemate.

References

External links 
 Paintshooters blog
 BLågaarden parish council

Danish contemporary artists
Stuckism
Living people
1979 births
Copenhagen Business School alumni